Snowfall: The Tony Bennett Christmas Album is a 1968 studio album by Tony Bennett, his first Christmas album. It was arranged and conducted by Robert Farnon.

Even though they had been friends since the early 1950s, Bennett and Farnon had not recorded together before, Bennett having such reverence for Farnon's work that he felt he "wasn't ready...(and) not developed enough as an artist to record with him". Farnon, who normally recorded in London, came to New York City for one of the two sessions that produced this album. Six tracks were recorded at Columbia's recording studios in New York City, and four in London.

In Bennett's autobiography, he recalls that the New York session was attended by such notable American arrangers as Don Costa, Marion Evans and Torrie Zito, all curious to see how Farnon worked. Quincy Jones subsequently threw a party for Farnon in New York City, and at the party there were so many famous musicians that Jones joked, "If a bomb goes off in this apartment, there won't be any more records made!"

The album was reissued on CD in 1994, with new cover art and a bonus track, "I'll Be Home for Christmas", recorded during a live appearance by Bennett on The Jon Stewart Show. It was reissued once more in 2007, again with different cover art and including a bonus DVD containing excerpts from Bennett's 1992 television special Tony Bennett: A Family Christmas.

Bennett later recorded two additional Christmas albums, Hallmark presents Christmas with Tony Bennett and the London Symphony Orchestra (2002) and A Swingin' Christmas (Featuring The Count Basie Big Band) (2008).

Track listing

Personnel
 Tony Bennett – vocal
 Robert Farnon – arrangement, conducting
 Jack Gold – producer

Charts

Certifications

References

1968 Christmas albums
Christmas albums by American artists
Tony Bennett albums
Albums arranged by Robert Farnon
Columbia Records Christmas albums
Albums recorded at CBS 30th Street Studio
Albums conducted by Robert Farnon